Mac OS 9 is the ninth major release of Apple's classic Mac OS operating system which was succeeded by Mac OS X (renamed to OS X in 2011 and macOS in 2016) in 2001. Introduced on October 23, 1999, it was promoted by Apple as "The Best Internet Operating System Ever", highlighting Sherlock 2's Internet search capabilities, integration with Apple's free online services known as iTools and improved Open Transport networking. While Mac OS 9 lacks protected memory and full pre-emptive multitasking, lasting improvements include the introduction of an automated Software Update engine and support for multiple users.

Apple discontinued development of Mac OS 9 in late 2001, transitioning all future development to Mac OS X. The final updates to Mac OS 9 addressed compatibility issues with Mac OS X while running in the Classic Environment and compatibility with Carbon applications. At the 2002 Worldwide Developers Conference, Steve Jobs began his keynote address by staging a mock funeral for OS 9.

Features
Apple billed Mac OS 9 as including "50 new features" and heavily marketed its Sherlock 2 software, which introduced a "channels" feature for searching different online resources and introduced a QuickTime-like metallic appearance. Mac OS 9 also featured integrated support for Apple's suite of Internet services known as iTools (later re-branded as .Mac, then MobileMe, which was replaced by iCloud) and included improved TCP/IP functionality with Open Transport 2.5.

Other features new to Mac OS 9 include:

Integrated support for multiple user accounts without using At Ease.
Support for voice login through VoicePrint passwords.
Keychain, a feature allowing users to save passwords and textual data encrypted in protected keychains.
A Software Update control panel for automatic download and installation of Apple system software updates.
A redesigned Sound control panel and support for USB audio.
Speakable Items 2.0, also known as PlainTalk, featuring improved speech synthesis and recognition along with AppleScript integration.
Improved font management through FontSync.
Remote Access Personal Server 3.5, including support for TCP/IP clients over Point-to-Point Protocol (PPP).
An updated version of AppleScript with support for TCP/IP.
Personal File Sharing over TCP/IP.
USB Printer Sharing, a control panel allowing certain USB printers to be shared across a TCP/IP network.
128-bit file encryption in the Finder.
Support for files larger than 2 GB.
Unix volume support.
CD Burning in the Finder (introduced in Mac OS 9.1).
Addition of a "Window" menu to the Finder (introduced in Mac OS 9.1)

Mac OS 9 and the Classic Environment

PowerPC versions of Mac OS X prior to 10.5 include a compatibility layer (a shell) called Classic, enabling users to run applications and hardware requiring Mac OS 9 from within OS X. This is achieved through running Mac OS 9 without access to its Finder inside OS X. This requires Mac OS 9 to be installed on the computer even though most computers that can run the Classic environment are not necessarily able to boot into Mac OS 9. Some Mac OS 9 applications do not run well in Classic. They demonstrate screen redraw problems and lagging performance. In addition, some drivers and other software which directly interact with the hardware fail to work properly.

In May 2002, at Apple's Worldwide Developers Conference in San Jose, California, Steve Jobs, accompanied by a coffin, held a mock funeral to announce that Apple had stopped the development of Mac OS 9. The final version of Mac OS 9 and the "classic" Mac OS was Mac OS 9.2.2, released in December 2001.

In June 2005, Jobs announced that the Macintosh platform would be transitioning to Intel x86 microprocessors. Developer documentation of the Rosetta PowerPC emulation layer revealed that applications written for Mac OS 8 or 9 would not run on x86-based Macs. The Classic Environment remains in the PowerPC version of 10.4; however, x86 versions of OS X do not support the Classic environment.

Mac OS 9 can be emulated by using SheepShaver, a PowerPC emulator available on multiple operating systems, including Intel-based Macs. However, SheepShaver cannot run Mac OS versions newer than 9.0.4, as there is no support for a memory management unit. The PearPC PowerPC emulator does not support Mac OS 9. QEMU has experimental support for running Mac OS 9 using PowerPC G4 emulation.

The final Macs that were able to boot into Mac OS 9 natively were the 867 MHz and 1 GHz "Antimony" Titanium PowerBook G4 released in November 2002 and the 1 GHz and 1.25 GHz "Mirrored Drive Doors" Power Mac G4 released in August 2002, which were re-released in June 2003 due to a perceived demand for Mac OS 9 machines. These machines were released around the time when Mac OS 9 was still offered on some Macs up until 2004, even though development had stopped in late 2001.

Both the "Antimony" Titanium PowerBook G4 and the "Mirrored Drive Doors" Power Mac G4 came preinstalled with both Mac OS 9 and Mac OS X in a dual-boot configuration (with Mac OS X being selected by default). The "Antimony" Titanium PowerBook G4 was the last PowerBook model able to run Mac OS 9 natively, while the "Mirrored Drive Doors" Power Mac G4 was one of the last Mac models overall to officially boot into Mac OS 9. While these final models of the Macs and PowerBooks have G4 processors with faster clock speeds up to 1 GHz and 1.25 GHz respectively, they were able to boot into Mac OS 9 natively without any issues.

The majority of G4 Macs released in 2003 that have a 1 GHz and higher processor cannot boot into Mac OS 9 outside of the Classic environment as the "Mac OS ROM" was never updated to allow those Macs, which were developed during the OS X era, to directly boot it (All G5 Macs cannot boot into Mac OS 9 at all since Mac OS 9 does not recognize the G5 processors, and therefore can only be run under the Classic environment).

In recent years, unofficial patches for Mac OS 9 and the "Mac OS ROM" have been made to allow unsupported G4 Macs to boot into Mac OS 9; however this is not officially supported by Apple.

Other uses

Aside from Apple-branded hardware that is still maintained and operated, Mac OS 9 can be operated in other environments such as Windows and Unix. For example, the aforementioned SheepShaver software was initially not designed for use on x86 platforms and required an actual PowerPC processor present in the machine it was running on similar to a hypervisor. Although it provides PowerPC processor support, it can only run up to Mac OS 9.0.4 because it does not emulate a memory management unit.

Version history

Updates to Mac OS 9 include 9.0.4, 9.1, 9.2.1, and 9.2.2. Mac OS 9.0.4 was a collection of bug fixes primarily relating to USB and FireWire support. Mac OS 9.1 included integrated CD burning support in the Macintosh Finder and added a new Window menu in the Finder for switching between open windows. Mac OS 9.2 increased performance noticeably and improved Classic Environment support.

Compatibility

See also
 List of Apple operating systems

References

External links
 from apple.com
 from apple.com
 from apple.com

	

1999 software
Classic Mac OS
PowerPC operating systems